|}

The Boyne Hurdle is Grade 2 National Hunt hurdle race in Ireland. It is run at Navan in February, over a distance of about 2 miles and 5 furlongs (4,225 metres) and during the race there are 12 hurdles to be jumped. The race was first run in 1987 as a Grade 3 race, and was run over a distance of 2 miles and 6 furlongs until 1994. It was awarded Grade 2 status in 2008.

Records
Most successful horse (2 wins):
 Trapper John -  1990,1992 
 Limestone Lad – 2001,2002
 Emotional Moment -  2003,2005 

Leading jockey  (4 wins):
 Barry Geraghty – Emotional Moment (2003,2005), Kazal (2008), Sutton Place (2017)
 Davy Russell -  Sweet Kiln (2007), War of Attrition (2010), Diamond Cauchois (2018), Cracking Smart (2020) 

Leading trainer (5 wins):
 Noel Meade -  Sallie's Girl (1999), Rosaker (2005), Snow Falcon (2016), Beacon Edge (2021), Thedevilscoachman (2022)

Winners

See also
 Horse racing in Ireland
 List of Irish National Hunt races

References
Racing Post:

National Hunt races in Ireland
National Hunt hurdle races
Navan Racecourse
Recurring sporting events established in 1987
1987 establishments in Ireland